Bashbari is a Gaon Panchayat of Goalpara District, state of Assam, India.

Education 
There are a number of educational facilities:
Bashbari ME Madrassa - from class 5 to 8; medium - Assamese
Bashbari High School - from class 9 and 10
Bashbari Adarsha Jatiya Bidyalaya - a private sector institute
Darul Ulum Tahfizul Qur'an Bashbari - for Islamic education
AN Academy, Bashbari

References 

Goalpara district